Vukšić may refer to:

People with the surname
Branko Vukšić (born 1956), Croatian journalist and politician
Slavko Vukšić (born 1949), Croatian politician and businessman
Tomo Vukšić (born 1954), bishop

Places
Vukšić, Croatia, a village near Benkovac
Vukšić Donji, village in Bosnia and Herzegovina
Vukšić Gornji, village in Bosnia and Herzegovina